Franco Squillari was the defending champion but lost in the third round to Guillermo Cañas.

Gustavo Kuerten won in the final 6–3, 6–2, 6–4 against Cañas.

Seeds
A champion seed is indicated in bold text while text in italics indicates the round in which that seed was eliminated. All sixteen seeds received a bye to the second round.

  Gustavo Kuerten (champion)
  Yevgeny Kafelnikov (quarterfinals)
  Arnaud Clément (third round)
  Dominik Hrbatý (third round)
  Fabrice Santoro (second round)
  Franco Squillari (third round)
  Hicham Arazi (second round)
  Guillermo Coria (second round)
  Nicolás Lapentti (quarterfinals)
  Guillermo Cañas (final)
  Andreas Vinciguerra (second round)
  Jiří Novák (semifinals)
  Alberto Martín (quarterfinals)
  Gastón Gaudio (quarterfinals)
  Andrei Pavel (second round)
  Albert Costa (third round)

Draw

Finals

Top half

Section 1

Section 2

Bottom half

Section 3

Section 4

References
 2001 Mercedes Cup Draw

Singles 2001
2001 ATP Tour